Play4 is a Belgian-Flemish commercial television channel. It is part of Play Media and production company Woestijnvis.

As of 2010, the channel has a market share of more than 7%.

The channel was formerly known as VIER from 17 September 2012 to 27 January 2021. On 28 January 2021, the channel was rebranded to Play4.

Its owner also operates sister stations Play5, Play6 and Play7. Broadcast entertainment, series, cartoons, movies, sports programmings.

History 

The channel began broadcasting on 1 February 1995 under the name VT4. The channel initially had no Belgian broadcasting license and was transmitted via London (actually from NTL's transmission station at Brookmans Park in Hertfordshire).

Today, VIER broadcasts legally from Zaventem in Belgium.  It is available on the cable network in Brussels as well as in Flanders. It's also available throughout Belgium on the IPTV network of Belgacom, who offers triple play everywhere in Belgium where VDSL is available.

On 17 September 2012, VT4 was rebranded as Vier.

On 7 June 2019, it was announced that the channel would be eventually rebranded as "Four" as part of the rebranding of the three channels under the "Play" name. The following year, it was decided that the channel would instead rebrand as Play4 on 28 January 2021.

HD broadcast
VT4 HD was launched as a temporary high-definition channel on June 7, 2008, to coincide with the kick-off of UEFA Euro 2008. It was merely a simulcast of VT4's schedule, but the Euro 2008 matches and all related talk shows were broadcast in HD. VT4 HD was available exclusively to Telenet Digital TV subscribers and was shut down on June 29, 2008.

On September 1, 2012, VT4 HD, along with sister channel VijfTV HD, launched as a HD simulcast. The channel was made available to Belgacom TV subscribers. On September 17, the day of the relaunch, both VIER HD and VIJF HD were made available for Telenet Digital TV subscribers.

Programming

 18 Wheels of Justice
 2 Broke Girls
 8 Simple Rules
 According to Jim
 Alcatraz
 Aliens in America
 Battlestar Galactica
 Ben 10
 Beyblade: Metal Fusion
 Beyblade: Metal Masters
 Bionic Woman
 Big Brother
 Big Shots
 Blade
 Blue Bloods
 Californication
 Callboys
 Castle
 Cheers
 Committed
 Criminal Minds
 CSI: Crime Scene Investigation
 CSI: Miami
 CSI: NY
 Dark Blue
 De Mol
 Dexter
 Dirt
 Donkey Kong Country
 Elementary
 Everybody Hates Chris
 Expeditie Robinson
 Extreme Makeover: Home Edition
 The Fairly OddParents
 Felicity
 Flashpoint
 Forever
 Friends
 Fringe
 Grounded for Life
 Hannah Montana
 Hawaii Five-0
 Hell's Kitchen USA
 Heroes
 Human Target
 Jericho
 Joan of Arcadia
 Kitchen Nightmares
 Knight Rider
 Las Vegas
 Law & Order
 Law & Order: Special Victims Unit
 Lost
 Man with a Plan
 Married... with Children
 MasterChef Australia
 MasterChef Australia: The Professionals
 Medical Investigation
 Mike & Molly
 Moon Over Miami
 My Wife and Kids
 NCIS
 NCIS: Los Angeles
 Nikita
 Numbers
 Peking Express
 People of Earth
 Pokémon
 Poker After Dark
 Psych
 Pushing Daisies
 Rules of Engagement
 Sailor Moon
 Samantha Who?
 Samurai Jack
 Scorpion
 Scrubs
 Sex and the City
 Space: Above and Beyond
 Street Time
 Supernatural
 Terminator: The Sarah Connor Chronicles
 The A-Team
 The Biggest Loser
 The Blacklist
 The Bold and the Beautiful
 The Following
 The Fresh Prince of Bel-Air
 The Glades
 The Great British Bake Off
 The Great Indoors
 The L Word
 The Life and Times of Juniper Lee
 The Mentalist
 The Nanny
 The Nine
 The Shield
 The Simpsons
 The Vampire Diaries
 The War at Home
 Threshold
 Totally Spies
 Touching Evil
 Two and a Half Men
 Under the Dome
 Vermist
 Winx Club
 Young Sheldon

(simulcast of channels of USA (ABC, CBS, NBC, Fox, The CW, among others) and others).

Video on demand
C-More was the VOD service of SBS Belgium. The name and logo are the result of the C More Entertainment group which delivers pay-TV, C More Entertainment was a part of the SBS Broadcasting Group which was bought by the ProSiebenSat.1 Media group which sold it to TV4 Gruppen. After the rename of the channel the service has been renamed to MEER (MORE). The service was available through Telenet Digital TV & Belgacom TV and was available on its own website MEER.be. MEER closed on 31 December 2014.

On 28 January 2021, SBS Belgium relaunched a VOD platform, GoPlay.

References

External links

 Play4 on GoPlay
 The Belgian Television Audience Measurement Company

Television channels in Flanders
Television channels in Belgium
ProSiebenSat.1 Media
Television channels and stations established in 1995
Zaventem